John "Jack" Feetham (birth unknown – death unknown) was an English professional rugby league footballer who played in the 1920s, 1930s and 1940s.

Background
Jack Feetham's birth was registered in Hull, East Riding of Yorkshire, England.

Playing career

International honours
Jack Feetham won a cap for England while at Salford in 1932 against Wales, and won caps for Great Britain while at Kingston Rovers in 1929–30 against Australia, while at Salford in 1932 against Australia (2 matches), and New Zealand (2 matches), and in 1933 against Australia (3 matches).

Les Diables Rouges
Jack Feetham was one of the players who successfully toured in France with Salford in 1934, during which the Salford team earned the name "Les Diables Rouges", the seventeen players were; Joe Bradbury, Bob Brown, Aubrey Casewell, Paddy Dalton, Bert Day, Cliff Evans, Jack Feetham, George Harris, Barney Hudson, Emlyn Jenkins, Alf Middleton, Sammy Miller, Harold Osbaldestin, Les Pearson, Gus Risman, Billy Watkins and Billy Williams.

Championship final appearances
Jack Feetham played  in Salford's 3–15 defeat by Wigan in the Championship Final during the 1933–34 season at Wilderspool Stadium, Warrington on Saturday 28 April 1934.

Challenge Cup Final appearances
Jack Feetham played  in Salford's 7–4 victory over Barrow in the 1938 Challenge Cup Final during the 1937–38 season at Wembley Stadium, London, in front of a crowd of 51,243.

County Cup Final appearances
About Jack Feetham's time, there was Salford's 2–15 defeat by Warrington in the 1929 Lancashire County Cup Final during the 1929–30 season at Central Park, Wigan on Saturday 23 November 1929, the 10–8 victory over Swinton in the 1931 Lancashire County Cup Final during the 1931–32 season at The Cliff, Broughton, Salford on Saturday 21 November 1931, the 21–12 victory over Wigan in the 1934 Lancashire County Cup Final during the 1934–35 season at Station Road, Swinton on Saturday 20 October 1934, the 15–7 victory over Wigan in the 1935 Lancashire County Cup Final during the 1935–36 season at Wilderspool Stadium, Warrington on Saturday 19 October 1935, the 5–2 victory over Wigan in the 1936 Lancashire County Cup Final during the 1936–37 season at Wilderspool Stadium, Warrington on Saturday 17 October 1936, and he played  in the 7–10 defeat by Wigan in the 1938 Lancashire County Cup Final during the 1938–39 season at Station Road, Swinton on Saturday 22 October 1938.

References

External links

England national rugby league team players
English rugby league players
Great Britain national rugby league team players
Hull Kingston Rovers players
Place of death missing
Rugby league locks
Rugby league players from Kingston upon Hull
Rugby league props
Salford Red Devils players
Year of birth missing
Year of death missing